DTMB (Digital Terrestrial Multimedia Broadcast) is the digital TV standard for mobile and fixed devices, developed in the People's Republic of China. It is used there and in both of their special administrative regions (Hong Kong and Macau), and also in Cambodia, the Comoros, Cuba, East Timor, Laos, Vietnam and Pakistan. In Pakistan, as part of the China–Pakistan Economic Corridor Project, ZTE Corporation will provide Pakistan Television Corporation collaboration across several digital terrestrial television technologies, staff training and content creation including partnerships with Chinese multinational companies in multiple areas including television sets and set top boxes as a form of "International Cooperation".

Overview
Previously known as DMB-T/H (Digital Multimedia Broadcast-Terrestrial/Handheld), the DTMB is a merger of the standards ADTB-T (developed by the Shanghai Jiao Tong University), DMB-T (developed by Tsinghua University) and TiMi (Terrestrial Interactive Multiservice Infrastructure); this last one is the standard proposed by the Academy of Broadcasting Science in 2002.

At first, neither Shanghai Jiao Tong University nor Tsinghua had enough political strength to make their own technology become the unique standard, so the final decision was to opt for a double standard, merged with the TIMI 3 standard, responding to a need for backward compatibility.

The DTMB was created in 2004 and finally became an official DTT standard in 2006.

DTMB in China
2005 trial
18/08/2006 formal adoption as a DTT standard
2008 analogue to digital switchover
2020-2021 analog switchoff
On 1 April 2021, the digital terrestrial television of the People's Republic of China fully turned, shifted and switched to all full high definition for all nationwide. Ref: wiki Acticle

DTMB channel available in China
National:
CCTV-1, 2, 4, 7, 9, 10, 11, 12, 13, 14, 15, CGTN English
Provinces:
Main channel of province TV in each province
High Definition Channel:
Varies
City or Local channel:
Varies

DTMB in Hong Kong

18/08/2006 formal adoption as a DTT standard
31/12/2007 analogue to digital switchover
30/11/2020 analogue switchoff

DTMB in Macau
18/08/2006 formal adoption as a DTT standard
15/07/2008 analogue to digital switchover

DTMB elsewhere
DTMB started in Laos in 2007.
Cambodia adopted the DTMB standard in 2012.
The Comoros chose DTMB in 2013.
Cuba adopted DTMB in 2013.
In 2017 Pakistan and ZTE signed a contract to deploy DTMB broadcasts in the country by 2020.
East Timor adopted DTMB and work to implement it started in 2019.

Versus CMMB 
See China Multimedia Mobile Broadcasting (CMMB).

Countries and territories using DTMB

Asia

including its SARs:

 (trial)

Caribbean

Africa

Description
Besides the basic functions of traditional television service, the DTMB allows additional services using the new television broadcasting system. DTMB system is compatible with fixed reception (indoor and outdoor) and mobile digital terrestrial television.

Mobile reception: is compatible with digital broadcasting TV in standard definition (SD), digital audio broadcasting, multimedia broadcasting and data broadcasting service.
Fixed reception: in addition to the previous services, also supports high definition digital broadcasting (HDTV).

Modulation
The DTMB standard uses many advanced technologies to improve their performance, for example, a pseudo-random noise code (PN) as a guard interval that allows faster synchronization system and a more accurate channel estimation, Low-Density Parity Check (LDPC) for error correction, modulation Time Domain Synchronization - Orthogonal Frequency Division Multiplexing (TDS-OFDM) which allows the combination of broadcasting in SD, HD and multimedia services, etc.

This system gives flexibility to the services offered to support the combination of single-frequency networks (SFN) and multi-frequency networks (MFN). The different modes and parameters can be chosen depending on the type of service and network's environment.

The sequence of pseudo-random pattern is defined in time domain and the information of the Discrete Fourier transform (DFT) is defined in the frequency domain. The two frames are multiplexed in the time domain, resulting in Time domain synchronization (TDS).

Functional scheme
This transmission system makes the conversion of the input signal to the output data of terrestrial TV signal.

The data passes through the encoder, the error protection process FEC (Forward Error Correction), through the constellation mapping process and then the interleaving processes the information to create the data blocks. The data block and the TPS information are multiplexed, and pass through the data processor to form the body structure. It combines information from the body and the head to form the frame and this is passed through the SRRC (Square Root Raised Cosine) filter to become a signal within an 8 MHz channel bandwidth. Finally the signal is modulated to put it in the corresponding frequency band.

Features
Bit-rate: from 4.813 Mbit/s to 32.486 Mbit/s
Combination of SD, HD, and multimedia services
Flexibility of services
Time and frequency domain of data-processing
Broadcasting of between 6 and 15 SD channels and 1 or 2 HD channels
Same quality of reception as wire broadcast

See also
 CMMB
 OFDM system comparison table
 Media of China
 Telecommunications in China
 Telecommunications industry in China
 Digital television in China (PRC)
 Technical standards in Hong Kong
 Digital terrestrial television
 ATSC Standards- Advanced Television Systems Committee Standard
 DVB-T - Digital Video Broadcasting—Terrestrial
 ISDB-T International - Integrated Services Digital Broadcasting International

References

Further reading

External links
ATSC, DTMB, DVB-T/DVB-T2, and ISDB-T - Digital Terrestrial Television (DTT)
DMB-TH Reference Design
 IEEE Spectrum - Does China Have the Best Digital Television Standard on the Planet?
 Information page of the standard on Standardization Administration of PRC site
 Official announcement of intent to approve the standard on August 1, 2007, made by Standardization Administration of PRC
 ChineseNewsNet report
 C|Net China report
Hong Kong Technical Standard for Digital Terrestrial Television Broadcasting
MING-T, Multistandard Integrated Network convergence for Global Mobile and Broadcast Technologies
 Venezuela starts trials DTMB

Digital television
Science and technology in the People's Republic of China
Science and technology in Hong Kong
Chinese inventions
2006 introductions
2006 establishments in China